John Shiel (also known as John Shields and John Spiel, May 1828 - 11 June 1908) was a sergeant in the United States Army who was awarded the Medal of Honor for gallantry during the American Civil War. Shiel was awarded the medal on 21 January 1897 for actions performed at the Battle of Fredericksburg on 13 December 1862.

Personal life 
Shiel was born in May 1828 in Scotland. He married Ellen J. Barlow in 1874 and fathered one son, Arthur Winfield Shiel. Shiel died on 11 June 1908 in Philadelphia, Pennsylvania and was buried in Greenmount Cemetery in Philadelphia.

Military service 
Upon enlistment into the Army, Shiel was assigned to Company E of the 90th Pennsylvania Infantry. His unit was involved in the Battle of Fredericksburg in Virginia. Shiel earned his medal on 13 December 1862, the second day of the battle.

Shiel's Medal of Honor citation reads:

References 

United States Army Medal of Honor recipients
American Civil War recipients of the Medal of Honor
1828 births
1908 deaths